Serhiy Volodymyrovych Zakarlyuka (17 August 1976 – 6 October 2014) was a Ukrainian footballer and football manager.

Zakarlyuka has played for a number of clubs in Ukraine and played for the Ukraine national team on 9 occasions between 2002 and 2004.

Death
On 6 October 2014, Zakarlyuka was killed in a traffic accident 20 km outside Poltava (Velyka Bahachka Raion) which also injured fellow player Ruslan Levyha.

References

External links
 

 

1976 births
2014 deaths
People from Nikopol, Ukraine
Association football midfielders
Ukrainian Premier League players
FC Arsenal Kyiv players
FC Shakhtar Donetsk players
FC Mariupol players
FC Metalurh Donetsk players
FC Dnipro players
FC Elektrometalurh-NZF Nikopol players
FC Vorskla Poltava players
FC Poltava players
Road incident deaths in Ukraine
Ukrainian football managers
FC Arsenal Kyiv managers
Ukrainian footballers
Ukraine international footballers
Ukraine under-21 international footballers
Sportspeople from Dnipropetrovsk Oblast